It's Your Move was a Canadian charade-style game show originally produced in the mid-1960s. Created by Art Baer and Ben Joelson (producers of The Love Boat), the show's original host was Paul Hanover.

On the program, teams bid against each other as to who could act out an answer to their teammate in less time. Doing so scored one point which the other team scored if the acting team failed. Three points won a prize, and $15 if the team scored at least one point on their own. The winners chose one of the three words they scored and revealed either a merchandise item, up to $250 in cash, or dinner for two. Two games won the match, and five games won a grand prize such as a trip.

It's Your Move was broadcast on the CTV television network for its full run, but was shown in United States syndication from September 18 to December 15, 1967 with Jim Perry as host.

The series was revived by producer-director Sidney M. Cohen in Canada from 1974 to 1979.

External links
An episode of It's Your Move from 1978

1960s Canadian game shows
1970s Canadian game shows
Black-and-white Canadian television shows
CTV Television Network original programming
Television shows filmed in Montreal
1964 Canadian television series debuts
1967 Canadian television series endings
1974 Canadian television series debuts
1979 Canadian television series endings